Benoit is a French name. Benoit may also refer to:

Places
Benoit, Alabama, an unincorporated community, United States
Benoit, Minnesota, an unincorporated community, United States
Benoit, Mississippi, a town, United States
Benoit, Texas, an unincorporated community, United States
Benoit, Wisconsin, an unincorporated community, United States

Other
Benoit (book), 2007 book about professional wrestler Chris Benoit
Chris Benoit (1967-2007), Canadian professional wrestler, known also for the double-murder suicide
Chris Benoit (song), 2012 song by Insane Clown Posse and Mike E. Clark
Jacques Benoit, (1896-1982), French biologist  and physician
Jacques Benoit, (1955-), French painter
Nancy Benoit (1964-2007), American professional wrestling valet and wife of Chris Benoit

See also
Bénédicte (disambiguation)